Fish & Cat (in Persian : ماهی و گربه; transliterated as Mahi va Gorbeh) is a 2013 mystery drama slasher Iranian film directed by Shahram Mokri about of a group of university students camping at a lakeside for kite-running competitions. The film is notable for being presented in a single, uncut 135-minute shot. The film was first premiered in the Venice Film Festival on 6 September 2013. The film won the Special Award in 2013 Venice Film Festival and the FIPRESCI award in 2014 Fribourg International Film Festival. In September 2015, Fish & Cat was one of ten shortlisted films for Iran's submission for the Best International Feature Film at the 88th Academy Awards, but ultimately was not selected.

Fish & Cat was inspired by the true story of a restaurant in northern Iran that served human flesh in the late 90s. Iranian actors Babak Karimi and Saeid Ebrahimifar, along with young, unknown theatre artists, appeared in the film.

Many critics found the film innovative and technically impressive. The film was screened in Iran in several cinemas, including Azadi Cinema Complex and Kourosh Complex in Tehran and Howeyzeh cinema complex in Mashhad.

Plot

A number of students have traveled to the Caspian region in order to participate in a kite-flying event during the winter solstice. Next to their camp is a small hut occupied by three cooks who work at a nearby restaurant.

Cast

Abed Abest as Parviz
Mona Ahmadi as Nadia 
Ainaz Azarhoush	as Parvaneh
Nazanin Babaei	as Shirin
Mohammad Berahmani as Boy
Siavash Cheraghipoor as Father
Saeed Ebrahimifar as Saeed
Alireza Esapoor	as Guard
Neda Jebraeili as Mina
Shadi Karamroudi as Maral
Babak Karimi as Babak
Mohammad Reza Maleki as Jamshid
Faraz Modiri as Kambiz
Milad Rahimi as Shahrooz
Arnavaz Safari as Asal
Nima Shahrabi as Twin
Pouya Shahrabi as Twin
Khosrow Shahraz as Hamid
Pedram Sharifi as Pedram
Parinaz Tayyeb as Maryam
Samaneh Vafaiezadeh as Ladan

Production
Gradually subverting a gruesome premise drawn from a real-life case of a backwoods restaurant that served human flesh, the film builds an atmosphere of tension as a menacing pair descend on a campsite where a group of college kids have gathered for a kite-flying festival. But as the camera doubles back and criss-crosses between characters in real time, subtle space-time paradoxes suggest that something bigger is going on.

Shahram Mokri said "I like the paintings of Maurits Escher, where you can see a change in perspective in the same visual. In my film, I wanted to give a change in perspective of time in one single shot. So the idea for the film came from his paintings.

Mokri added "Fish & Cat is a film about time. How you can make a perspective in it and break that. This film was interesting for me to make and that was because of its method of production. Insisting on narrating a story in a single shot and try to break the time which goes ahead."

Music
Mokri wanted a kind of music that combined minimal music with the music of horror Z-movies, so he asked Kristoph Rezaee to score the film.

Critical reception

Manohla Dargis from The New York Times wrote: " It’s a tour de force — the cinematographer is Mahmoud Kalari, who shot A Separation — and as quietly political as it is brazenly cinematic."

Steve MacFarlane from Slant Magazine wrote: "The film is a game: Shahram Mokri challenges his viewers to grip parallel narrative threads in what feels like suspiciously real time, rather than to assemble or contextualize any metaphorical ones."

Alissa Simon from Variety wrote: "“A highly original, compelling feature, filmed in one long, bravura shot establishing Shahram Mokri as a distinctive talent.”

Awards
Dubai International Film Festival 2013 - Muhr AsiaAfrica Special Jury Prize
Fribourg International Film Festival 2014 - FIPRESCI Prize and Youth Jury Award
Venice Film Festival 2013 - Venice Horizons Award - Special Prize
13th Lisbon International Film Festival - Best Film award 
13th If Istanbul Independent Film Festival - Best Film Award

References

External links
The Official Website of Fish & Cat

2013 films
2010s slasher films
Films shot in Iran
Iranian horror films
Iranian slasher films
One-shot films